Hollywood Cowboys is the fourteenth studio album by the heavy metal band Quiet Riot. The album was released on Frontiers Records on November 8, 2019, and was produced by drummer Frankie Banali. This is the last album to feature Banali before his death in 2020 from pancreatic cancer (to which he was diagnosed with not long before its release), and also their last to feature vocalist James Durbin and bassist Chuck Wright before their departures in 2019 and 2021 respectively.

Reception

Hollywood Cowboys received average reviews. Reviewer Aaron Badgley of Spill Magazine said ″band who knows what they do, and they do it well″ but the album overall was average and contained ″no mystery″ and is ″exactly what you would expect from Quiet Riot″.

Track listing

Personnel
Quiet Riot
 James Durbin – lead and background vocals
 Alex Grossi – guitars
 Chuck Wright – electric and upright bass
 Frankie Banali – drums, percussion

Additional musicians
 August Young - additional vocals, lyrics on ″Roll On″
 Jacob Bunton - additional vocals, lyrics on ″Don't Call It Love″, ″In The Blood″, ″Heartbreak City″, and ″The Devil That You Know″
 Neil Turbin - additional vocals, lyrics on ″Change Or Die″ and ″Insanity″
 Neil Citron - additional guitar on ″Change Or Die″, dobro, organ, piano on ″Roll On″

References

2019 albums
Quiet Riot albums
Frontiers Records albums